In commercial network routing between autonomous systems which are interconnected in multiple locations, hot-potato routing is the practice of passing traffic off to another autonomous system as quickly as possible, thus using their network for wide-area transit. Cold-potato routing is the opposite, where the originating autonomous system holds onto the packet until it is as near to the destination as possible.

For example, consider the case of two ISP's, A and B, who both have global networks. Additionally, they have peering agreements in both Europe and in Asia, which allows them to exchange data packets destined for the other's network at either location. Now suppose a European customer of ISP A  wants to transmit a data packet to an Asian customer of ISP B. ISP A will receive the packet in Europe and has to decide where to send the packet next. The first option is to hand off the packet to ISP B in Europe, and let ISP B carry the packet to Asia to be delivered to its destination. This is called hot-potato routing, since ISP A hands off the packet at the earliest opportunity, as in a game of hot potato. The second option is for ISP A to carry the packet to Asia on its internal network, and hand it off to ISP B there. This is called cold-potato routing by symmetry, since ISP A keeps the packet in its internal network as long as possible.

Hot-potato routing 

Hot-potato routing is the normal behavior of most settlement-free peering agreements. Hot-potato routing has the effect that the network receiving the data bears the cost of carrying it between cities.  When the traffic ratio (the ratio of traffic flowing in one direction to the traffic flowing in the other direction between peers) is reasonably even, this is considered fair, because the networks will share evenly in carrying traffic exchanged by their customers between cities.

The marginal cost of carrying traffic between cities depends on how the network has purchased those links; some networks own dark fiber, which can be upgraded by merely replacing the equipment on each end of the fiber, and possibly the amplifiers along the path between cities.  In other cases, the network has an agreement with a telco that allows for a specific amount of bandwidth, and upgrading involves paying more money to the telco.

Cold-potato routing 

Cold-potato routing, on the other hand, is more expensive to do, but keeps the traffic under the network administrator's control for longer, allowing operators of well-provisioned networks to offer a higher quality of service to their customers.  It can also be preferred when connecting to content providers; if content providers use cold-potato routing, they may escape from paying for the cost of links between cities.

Cold-potato routing is prone to misconfiguration as well as poor coordination between two networks. In such scenarios, packets can be routed further distances and can allow another autonomous system to manipulate routing in a network for various purposes. Cold-potato routing requires a level of trust between two networks that either side will not attempt to "cheat" the other.

Some content networks favor the use of cold-potato routing (multi exit discriminator exchange/honoring) in order to deliver content from replicated server farms closer to the end-user.

Route announcement policy 

The terms can also be used to describe the route announcement policy of a network: by choosing to announce their network at a large number of points at the periphery of another autonomous system, a provider can pull incoming traffic onto their network as soon as possible, ensuring that the traffic stays on their network all the way to their customer's connection.

References

Internet architecture